Dove Across The Water is a folk album by Ossian recorded and released in 1982. The original LP release was on Iona Records (catalogue number IONA IR0004), with at least one rerelease on CD currently unavailable.

The album was recorded at Castle Sound Studios, Pencaitland, East Lothian, Scotland during April 1982, was produced by Ossian and engineered by Calum Malcolm.

The "Dove Across The Water" sequence is a rearranged and rerecorded version of music created for the film "Iona... Dove Across The Water" produced for Films Of Scotland by Mike Alexander in 1982.

Track listing 
This listing is taken from the original LP release. All titles are traditional arr. Ossian except where noted.

Duncan Johnstone / The Duck (D. Macleod) / The Curlew (D.Macpherson) (4:39)
Braw Sailin' on the Sea (Trad. / Cuffe) (5:02)
Drunk at Night, Dry in the Morning (2:54)
Will Ye Go To Flanders? (Trad. / Ross) (6:04)
Tae the Beggin' (4:43)
Mile Marbhaisg (2:54)
Dove Across The Water
Iona Theme (Jackson) (1:56)
March - The Cunning Workmen (Cuffe) (3:49)
Columba (Jackson) (4:19)
Iona Theme, Reprise (Jackson) (1:52)

Personnel 
Billy Jackson - Harp, Uileann pipes, whistle, double bass, vocals
George Jackson - Guitar, fiddle, whistle, vocals
John Martin - Fiddle, cello, vocals
Tony Cuffe - Vocals, guitar, tenor guitar, tiplé
Iain MacDonald - Pipes, vocals, flute, whistle, Jew's harp

with Flora MacNeil and Maggie MacInnes

1982 albums